Jarrell Cove State Park is a Washington state park on Harstine Island in south Puget Sound. Park activities include camping, hiking, biking, boating, scuba diving, fishing, swimming, waterskiing, clamming, crabbing, field sports, beachcombing, windsurfing, birdwatching, wildlife viewing, and horseshoes.

Jarrell Cove State Park administers five satellite state parks: Eagle Island, Harstine Island (a day-use park  from Jarrell Cove with beach access via a  trail), Hope Island, McMicken Island, and Stretch Point.

The park was established in 1953 and gradually expanded in the 1960s. It was initially known as Gerald Cove State Park, but the spelling was corrected in 1966 upon the request of the Hartstene Island Grange.

References

External links
Jarrell Cove State Park Washington State Parks and Recreation Commission 
Jarrell Cove State Park Map Washington State Parks and Recreation Commission

State parks of Washington (state)
Parks in Mason County, Washington
Protected areas established in 1953